The 1932 Birmingham–Southern Panthers football team was an American football team that represented Birmingham–Southern College as a member of the Dixie Conference during the 1932 college football season. In their fifth season under head coach Jenks Gillem, the team compiled a 5–3 record.

Schedule

References

Birmingham–Southern
Birmingham–Southern Panthers football seasons
Birmingham–Southern Panthers football